Interplanetary Flight: An Introduction to Astronautics is a short, modestly technical introduction to space exploration written by Arthur C. Clarke, and published in 1950. It includes material accessible to readers with a high-school level of science and technical education, covering the elements of orbital mechanics, rocket design and performance, various applications of Earth satellites, a discussion of the more interesting and accessible destinations in the Solar System (such as they were understood at the time of writing),  and in a final chapter covering the rationale and value of human expansion off the Earth.

Overview
The book includes ten chapters:
 Historical Survey
 The Earth's Gravitational Field
 The Rocket
 The Problem of Escape by Rocket
 The Earth-Moon Journey
 Interplanetary Flight
 The Atomic Rocket
 Spaceships and Space Stations
 Subsidiary Problems
 Opening Frontiers

A short mathematical appendix is provided (for the benefit of readers not versed in the calculus), plus a bibliography and index, for a total of 164 pages.   It includes also many figures and diagrams, and 15 plates (now largely of historical interest, showing how far space exploration has advanced since 1950).

References

1950 non-fiction books
Books by Arthur C. Clarke
Spaceflight books
Astronautics